Faroe Islands participated at the 2015 European Games, in Baku, Azerbaijan from 12 to 28 June 2015. Since the Faroe Islands are not members of the European Olympic Committee, the Faroese participants took part under the Ligue Européenne de Natation in the swimming contests.

Swimming 

Men

Women

References

Nations at the 2015 European Games
2015 in Faroese sport